The Leyenda de Plata (2018) was professional wrestling tournament produced by the Mexican wrestling promotion Consejo Mundial de Lucha Libre (CMLLl; Spanish "World Wrestling Council") that ran from November 16, 2018, over the course of two of CMLL's Friday night shows in Arena México with the finals on November 23, 2018. The annual Leyenda de Plata tournament is held in honor of lucha libre legend El Santo and is one of CMLL's most important annual tournaments.

For the first part of the Leyenda de Plata tournament King Phoenix and Bárbaro Cavernario outlasted a field of 16 in a torneo cibernetico elimination match that also included Audaz, Dragón Rojo Jr., El Felino, Flyer, Kawato-San, Mephisto, Místico, Soberano Jr., Templario, Tiger, Titán, Tritón, Virus, and Volador Jr. on the November 16 Super Viernes show. The following week Cavernario defeated King Phoenix, two falls to one, to win the 2018 Leyenda de Plata tournament. The November 24, 2018 Super Viernes also celebrated the 40th anniversary of Máscara Año 2000's debut.

Production

Background
The Leyenda de Plata (Spanish for "the Silver Legend") is an annual lucha libre tournament scripted and promoted by the Mexican professional wrestling promotion Consejo Mundial de Lucha Libre (CMLL).  The first Leyenda de Plata was held in 1998 and was in honor of El Santo, nicknamed Enmáscarado de Plata (the Silver mask) from which the tournament got its name. The trophy given to the winner is a plaque with a metal replica of the mask that El Santo wore in both wrestling and lucha films.

The Leyenda de Plata was held annually until 2003, at which point El Santo's son, El Hijo del Santo left CMLL on bad terms. The tournament returned in 2004 and has been held on an almost annual basis since then. The original format of the tournament was the Torneo cibernetico elimination match to qualify for a semi-final. The winner of the semi-final would face the winner of the previous year's tournament in the final. Since 2005 CMLL has held two cibernetico matches and the winner of each then meet in the semi-final. In 2011, the tournament was modified to eliminate the final stage as the previous winner, Místico, did not work for CMLL at that point in time The 2018 edition of La Leyenda de Plata was the 16th overall tournament held by CMLL.

Storylines
The events featured a total of twelve professional wrestling matches with different wrestlers involved in pre-existing scripted feuds, plots and storylines. Wrestlers were portrayed as either heels (referred to as rudos in Mexico, those that portray the "bad guys") or faces (técnicos in Mexico, the "good guy" characters) as they followed a series of tension-building events, which culminated in a wrestling match or series of matches.

Torneo Cibernetico overview

Results

November 16, 2018

November 23, 2018

References

2018 in professional wrestling
Leyenda de Plata
Events in Mexico City
December 2018 events in Mexico